Bước nhảy hoàn vũ 2011 is the second season of Bước nhảy hoàn vũ produced by Vietnam Television and Cat Tien Sa Productions based upon the BBC Worldwide's Dancing with the Stars. The show encountered numerous changes, including a proposed reduction of the judging panel to the number of just three judges (three return), but was opposed and remained unchanged at four (two among them are new), the quitting of several cast members prior the launching and the departure of judges either before or during the show, a new co-host, new professionals as well as multiple changes in format written by the copyright holder from Bulgaria. The first show was aired on VTV3 with 10 celebrities. There was not an elimination the first two weeks of competition. The first took place on the third week (May 1).

Only Khánh Thi and Chí Anh, two judges from the previous season and Thanh Bạch returned. Thanh Vân left the show involved in her pregnancy. Two directors, Nguyễn Quang Dũng and Lê Hoàng, claimed they had conflicts with timetables, so they could not remain with the show for ten episodes. It was officially announced that Trần Tiến and Đức Huy consecutively took the roles, respectively. Ngô Thanh Vân was offered the female host role meanwhile executive producer Lại Văn Sâm was offered the fourth slot on the judging panel but both softly refused. First season runner-up Đoan Trang was confirmed as co-host. On May 11, Trần Tiến revealed his departure from the show and the producer put Quang Dũng back to the panel.

Professionals Anna Silova and Tisho Gavrilov also returned for one more season. Others were Aleksandar Vachev, Daniel Nikolov Denev, Lachezar Stefanov Todorov, Petyo Dimitrov Stoyanov, Petya Bozhidarova Dimitrova, Valeriya Nikolaeva Bozukova, Tsveta Krasimirova Tsocheva and Iva Ludmilova Grigorova. Vũ Thu Minh was announced to be the second Dancing Queen with her partner, Lachezar Stefanov Todorov.

Controversies

Contestants
Huy Tran was one of the first person to edit Michael Jackson's song "Beat it" and made it famous. Phan Anh, Thủy Tiên, Vũ Thu Phương, and Trương Ngọc Tình were the first four faces to appear in the competition, but right later two male celebrities confirmed they were no longer joining the cast members. Afterwards, Thu Minh, Huy Khánh, Đại Nghĩa, Phạm Anh Khoa, Kim Hiền, Thanh Thúy and Vĩnh Thụy were confirmed to participate. On March 29, Vĩnh Thụy withdrew from the competition. Immediately, Hứa Vỹ Văn was chosen to replace and Nguyên Vũ was the last celebrity to join.

Judges' acting roles
The departure of Trần Tiến has raised a lot controversial problems to Bước Nhảy Hoàn Vũ this year. Many journalists from notable daily newspapers and magazines (namely Tuổi Trẻ, Thanh Niên, VnExpress, etc.) accused the producers of ill preparing, organizing the show and forcing judges play acting roles in many different types of characteristics of judging on the panel (like easy-going, humour, fantastic, etc.) like a color commentator rather than allowing them to naturally judge the performance from contestants. The grading scale even restrictedly ranges from 7 up to 10; in the case of Chí Anh (who did not hesitate assigning a 6 without explanation or comment to a contestant), he was immediately given a feedback by Host Thanh Bạch whether the grade was wrong.

The jury were not given contracts to sign nor were they informed as to how much time they would spend on this competition. Director Lê Hoàng confirmed his involvement prior to the first week launched, but did not appear in the first week and left the following week to be replaced by musician Đức Huy.

Elimination order
According to Người đưa tin, the withdrawal of Vĩnh Thụy was like a pre-show elimination because no one could be too fool to easily leave the highest rated show which helped them a lot to gain more fame and earn more money. The pre-elimination was heavily promoted by the media.

About the real cast member, step by step Vĩ Văn, Kim Hiền, Huy Khánh, Vũ Thu Phương, etc. were eliminated as audience thought. Hoàng Anh, who was Huy Khánh's ex-wife, used Facebook note for raising a tension with the producers after he was out of the race. She also reported Khánh said to their kid to watch Bước nhảy hoàn vũ on Sunday night prior to his elimination. That seemed the producers played treat, particularly had rigged the show. Producers denied these claims as baseless stating that there was officially a company collecting and classifying messages, and the results were not be revealed by producers alone without VTV's permission.  Simultaneously, they refused to give any information about how Huy Khánh was sent home. Under pressure, producers finally agreed to provide information about textgate and to clarify everything.

Mimicking
On week 7, Thu Minh wowed the judging panel with her exotic dance concept. Later, she came out on top of the board with two 10s for Samba. The next Monday, it was revealed that the choreography and wardrobe she wore looked amazingly similar to those of Max Kozhevnikov and Yulia Zagoruychenko in the World Super Stars Dance Festival in 2006. In sudden press reports earlier in the week, two main judges Khánh Thi and Chí Anh stated "mimicking is actually self mastering, is the creativity of Thu Minh and Lachezar". Producers tried to help
Thu Minh, claiming it was not Thu Minh's fault, that the wardrobe was made from our set of designers' ideas and gave no comment about the choreography.

Conflict
Khánh Thi was viewed as envious of Thủy Tiên for the latter's
sexy body language and her risky techniques used in performances. In press reports, she denied having any conflict with competitor Thủy Tiên, resulting in unfair marks.

Timing violation
Every performance should be performed in one and a half minutes according to standard practices in almost all versions Dancing with the Stars and in international competitions. The length of Thu Minh's performance was deemed the longest and the shortest performance was that of Đại Nghĩa with only 1 minute 40 seconds. Thu Minh was crowned the winner. Once again in the week 9 and in the finale, Thu Minh and Lacho had additional performances.

Textgate
During week 9, there was additional controversy the week couple Anh Khoa and Iva were voted off. Some voters claimed that they could not send messages voting for Anh Khoa during textgate open, when received confirmatory text "Vui lòng nhắn tin bình chọn sau khi các thí sinh đã tham gia xong phần thi của mình. Xin chân thành cảm ơn" (literally: "Text after all performances done. Thank you for voting"). It is not clear if the "Thank you for voting" messages were incorrectly assigned, as if the replies were incorrectly assigned, votes would have been counted for the correct contestant despite the voters receiving the wrong "thank you" messages.

All involved including the broadcaster, producers and textgate owner informed no errors during week 9 (June 26) in public press. They also revealed the out of phase of the text-gate with live audience which meant people could only text formally from 30 seconds up to a minute in normal mode after the announcement of hosts and clearly voting could be continued during short time when the gate was deemed closed.

Unfair scores 
In the case of Anh Khoa and Iva, all four judges gathered for quick break  for discussion about giving scores.

They are harshly criticized for giving generous scores very sentimentally based upon the case that contestants or partners' sickness, family's bad luck, not so serious injury and so on from the very first beginning of season 1 onwards.

No live shows in Ho Chi Minh City, No international winners 
In public press released for pre-production, there would exist many live shows in Ho Chi Minh City and other live shows in Vũng Tàu as producers informed. Later, Hanoi was offered 1-2 live shows for premiere weeks. Actually after the series ended, audience in HCMC had none show to enjoy. One of judges explained clearly bad organization and a bunch of controversies let Department of Culture, Sports and Tourisim of Ho Chi Minh City not allow the show to arrive at HCMC.

Also, no winners from China Mainland, Indonesia, Finland came performing.

Finale crowning 
Again and again, voting problem raised tension. Few voters affirmed that there was no message responded even 7 hours later. It is generally agreed Thu Minh deserved the win for her spectacular and outstanding Rumba and Freestyle routines engraving two highest scores to the show's history and praised by the most talented former dancing couple Khánh Thi and Chí Anh. People, whereas, wondered themselves why Thủy Tiên previously determined the favourite competitor of the year had fewer votes and why audience backed out at her. No official statement was made.

Besides that, there was much discussion in the communication industry about the real winner because there was confusion over the crowning. Initially, Đoan Trang revealed the runner-up, thus the other was the winner. Trang announced 79 scored by the runner-up. Moments that turned Thủy Tiên (who obviously scored 77) to the edge of glory and turned Thu Minh (who truly scored 79 out of possible 80) slightly blue was quickly stopped with the real name "Thủy Tiên", leading everyone got shocked. As interpreted, mistakes was caused by result paper.

Ngô Thanh Vân finale involvement 
Many fans of first season winner, Ngô Thanh Vân, were upset that she did not take part in the whole new season, especially season finale. Executive producer Lương Minh responded in an interview with Dân Trí: "We have invited her to season finale as guest; however, she refused to attend because of being busy [going to America]. As she showed agreement, we could not change the schedule set because Tisho, her former partner doesn't have enough time [...] and the show's length doesn't allow us to do so. [...] Maybe she can join many next season finales". Asked Thanh Vân, "Uhm... due to some reasons... tomorrow I can't be in BNHV... Everyone... [I] don't know what to say... please don't go sorrow...!!!" She also mentioned, "I am always ready to serve when invited; however, at the time, I give no comments".

Bước nhảy hoàn vũ: The Striptease Show 
Tendency of peeling clothes (undressing) on stage was up gradually, beginning in the first week and accumulating in the finale. It is more focused on the "tease" in "striptease" than the "strip". At least six peeling actions were performed namely by Thu Minh, Valeriya and Đại Nghĩa, Kim Hiền, Vũ Thu Phương and Hồ Ngọc Hà herself. These actions are considered over-sexy, seductive and influence the culture in a bad manner.

Couples

Scoring chart 

Red numbers indicate the lowest score for each week.
Green numbers indicate the highest score for each week.
 indicate the favorite contestant of the week
 indicates the winning couple.
 indicates the runner-up couple.
 indicates the third-place couple.
 indicates the couple eliminated that week.
 indicates the returning couple that finished in the bottom two.
 indicates the returning couple that was the last to be called safe (they may or may have not been in the bottom two).

 Week 2: The competition officially kicked off. Musician Đức Huy joined the judging panel in replacement with Lê Hoàng.
 Week 3: Despite suffering from Chickenpox (so did Kim Hiền), Anh Khoa & Iva performed quite well and came out on top of the leader board with  including two first 10s of the season for their Bulgarian folk dance. In combination with Week 2, they had the best score. Vĩ Văn & Anna's ill performance led them to be eliminated. This was also the last week, Trần Tiến judged the show.
 Week 4: After Trần Tiến's departure from the show, Nguyễn Quang Dũng was confirmed be back this season. Luchezar Stefanov Todorov did not team up with Thu Minh because of Chickenpox and he is alternated by Ngô Minh Đức, the very first Vietnamese professional to join Bước nhảy hoàn vũ. Thu Minh & Ngô Minh Đức were at top of the leaderboard with four 9s. Kim Hiền & Daniel received  for their Quickstep and were subsequently sent home.
Thanh Thúy & Aleks' performance received  with two 10s and were at top of the leaderboard. In spite of not having the least score, Huy Khánh & Tsveta were eliminated.
Thanh Thúy & Aleksandar came second with  including one 10 for their Foxtrot. As a result, Vũ Thu Phương & Tisho were eliminated after landing to the bottom two three times in a row.
As a result, Đại Nghĩa & Valeriya were sent home.
 Week 8: Aleksandar got leg-injured during rehearsal. Thanh Thúy let the nerve turn her down and send her package home.
 Week 9: Every single couple scored at least one 10 for their performance. Anh Khoa and Iva had a worse performance, leading them land to bottom two and be sent home.
 Week 10 - Finale: First time in history, 40 was scored and there were two 40s assigned consecutively by Thu Minh & Lacho for the Rumba and by Thủy Tiên & Petyo for Freestyle. Ultimately, Thu Minh was crowned the Dancing Queen.

Highest and lowest scoring performances 
The best and worst performances in each dance according to the judges' marks are as follows:

Couples' highest and lowest scoring dances

Styles, scores & songs

Week 1 - Launch Night 
Air date: April 17, 2011
Location: Quan Ngua Sports Palace, Hanoi

The season premiere included some special performances from guests, judges, professionals and competitors. The main competition kicks off in the following week.

Week 2 + 3

Week 2 

Air date: April 24
Location: Quan Ngua Sports Palace, Hanoi
Routines: Cha-Cha-Cha and English Waltz
Performers: Hồ Trung Dũng, Tiêu Châu Như Quỳnh, Dương Ánh Linh
Guest(s): Nguyễn Ngọc Anh, violist Trần Quang Duy

Individual judges scores in charts below (given in parentheses) are listed in this order from left to right: Trần Tiến - Khánh Thi - Đức Huy - Chí Anh. The results of the voting is combined with the ranking of the panel of judges, and the celebrities have the higher scores in total survive.

Performing order

Week 3 
Air date: May 1
Location: Quan Ngua Sports Palace, Hanoi
Routines: Freestyle
Performers: Hồ Trung Dũng, Tiêu Châu Như Quỳnh, Lê Kim Ngân
Guest(s): DJ Slim V, Tùng Dương

Individual judges scores in charts below (given in parentheses) are listed in this order from left to right: Trần Tiến - Khánh Thi - Đức Huy - Chí Anh. The results of the voting is combined with the ranking of the panel of judges, and the celebrities have the higher scores in total survive. It is the last week that Trần Tiến joins the judging panel.

Performing order

Week 4 
Air date: May 15
Location: Quan Ngua Sports Palace, Hanoi
Routines: Rumba or Quickstep
Performers: Hồ Trung Dũng, Tiêu Châu Như Quỳnh, Lê Kim Ngân
Guest(s): Minh Quân, professional Ngô Minh Đức

Nguyễn Quang Dũng prominently takes his role back after Trần Tiến's announcing his departure. Individual judges scores in charts below (given in parentheses) are listed in this order from left to right: Nguyễn Quang Dũng - Khánh Thi - Đức Huy - Chí Anh. The results of the voting is combined with the ranking of the panel of judges, and the celebrities have the higher scores in total survive.

Performing order

Week 5 
Air date: May 22
Location: Quan Ngua Sports Palace, Hanoi
Routines: Jive & Tango
Performers: Lê Kim Ngân, Dương Ánh Linh & Tuyết Mai
Guest(s): violist Bùi Quang Duy, Đức Tuấn

Individual judges scores in charts below (given in parentheses) are listed in this order from left to right: Nguyễn Quang Dũng - Khánh Thi - Đức Huy - Chí Anh. The results of the voting is combined with the ranking of the panel of judges, and the celebrities have the higher scores in total survive.

Performing order

Week 6 
Air date: May 29
Location: Quan Ngua Sports Palace, Hanoi
Routines: Foxtrot or Pasodoble
Performers: Hồ Trung Dũng, Tiêu Châu Như Quỳnh & Lê Kim Ngân
Guest(s): Doreen Fernandez from the Philippines

Individual judges scores in charts below (given in parentheses) are listed in this order from left to right: Nguyễn Quang Dũng - Khánh Thi - Đức Huy - Chí Anh. The results of the voting is combined with the ranking of the panel of judges, and the celebrities have the higher scores in total survive.

Performing order

Week 7 
Air date: June 5
Location: Quan Ngua Sports Palace, Hanoi
Routines: Samba and Exhibition Dance (Cha-Cha-Cha)
Performers: Hồ Trung Dũng, Tiêu Châu Như Quỳnh, Lê Kim Ngân & Mr. A
Guest(s): Thanh Lam

Individual judges scores in charts below (given in parentheses) are listed in this order from left to right: Nguyễn Quang Dũng - Khánh Thi - Đức Huy - Chí Anh. The results of the voting is combined with the ranking of the panel of judges, and the celebrities have the higher scores in total survive.

Performing order

Week 8 
Air date: June 19
Location: Complex Gymnasium of Vũng Tàu
Routines: Viennese Waltz and One unlearned routine from past weeks
Performers: Hồ Trung Dũng, Tiêu Châu Như Quỳnh, Lê Kim Ngân & Dương Ánh Linh
Guest(s): Thanh Bui, Oksana Nikiforova & Vasily Anokhin

Individual judges scores in charts below (given in parentheses) are listed in this order from left to right: Nguyễn Quang Dũng - Khánh Thi - Đức Huy - Chí Anh. The results of the voting is combined with the ranking of the panel of judges, and the celebrities have the higher scores in total survive.

Performing order

Week 9 
Air date: June 26
Location: Complex Gymnasium of Vũng Tàu
Routines: Two unlearned routines from past weeks
Performers: Hồ Trung Dũng, Dương Ánh Linh, Tiêu Châu Như Quỳnh & Tuyết Mai
Guest(s): Tiêu Châu Như Quỳnh, Minh Hằng

Individual judges scores in charts below (given in parentheses) are listed in this order from left to right: Nguyễn Quang Dũng - Khánh Thi - Đức Huy - Chí Anh. The results of the voting is combined with the ranking of the panel of judges, and the celebrities have the higher scores in total survive.

Performing order

Week 10 - Finale 
Air date: July 3
Location: Quan Ngua Sports Palace, Hanoi
Routines: Favourite routine of the season and Freestyle routine
Performers: Hồ Trung Dũng, Tiêu Châu Như Quỳnh, Lê Kim Ngân & Tuyết Mai
Guest(s): Eliminated couples, Hồ Ngọc Hà

Individual judges scores in charts below (given in parentheses) are listed in this order from left to right: Nguyễn Quang Dũng - Khánh Thi - Đức Huy - Chí Anh. The results of the voting is combined with the ranking of the panel of judges, and the celebrities have the higher scores in total survive.

Competition performances

Non-Competition performances

Call-out Order 

 This couple came in first place with the judges.
 This couple came in last place with the judges.
 This couple came in last place with the judges and was eliminated.
 This couple was eliminated.
 This couple was audience's favorite of the week.
 This couple came in first place with the judges and gained the most vote from audience.
 This couple won the competition.
 This couple came in second in the competition.
 This couple came in third in the competition

Dance Schedule 
The celebrities and professional partners danced one of these routines for each corresponding week.
 Week 2: Cha-Cha-Cha or English Waltz
 Week 3: Freestyle Routine
 Week 4: Rumba or Quickstep
 Week 5: Tango or Jive
 Week 6: Foxtrot or Pasodoble
 Week 7: Samba and Exhibition Dance
 Week 8: Viennese Waltz and One unlearned routine from past weeks
 Week 9: Two unlearned routines from past weeks
 Finale: Favorite Dances of the Season and Freestyle Routine

Dance Chart 

 Highest scoring dance
 Lowest scoring dance
 Performed but not scored

Guest Performances

References 

Bước nhảy hoàn vũ
2010s Vietnamese television series
2011 Vietnamese television seasons